The Acer Liquid A1 (S100) is a smartphone manufactured by Acer Inc. of Taiwan. It was launched on 7 December 2009 in the UK. The phone is Acer's first to use the Android operating system, backed by Google. It is also the world's first Android phone to use a Snapdragon processor.

Specifications

Hardware
The Acer Liquid A1 has a 3.5-inch TFT capacitive touchscreen display, 768 MHz Scorpion Qualcomm Snapdragon S1 processor, 256 MB of RAM and 512 MB of internal storage that can be expanded using microSD cards up to 32 GB. The phone has a 1350 mAh Li-Ion battery, 5 MP rear camera with no selfie camera. It is available in Black, White, Red colors.

Software
Acer announced their intention to release an update for the Acer Liquid in the first half of 2010 that would upgrade the Android OS 1.6 version to version 2.1 (Eclair). The update finally came in July 2010.

See also
Acer Liquid E
Acer Liquid Metal
Galaxy Nexus
List of Android devices

References

External links
Acer Smartphone official site
Acer Liquid official site

Liquid A1
Android (operating system) devices
Touchscreen portable media players
Mobile phones introduced in 2009